Freadelpha vittata is a species of beetle in the family Cerambycidae. It was described by Per Olof Christopher Aurivillius in 1907. It is known from the Republic of the Congo and the Democratic Republic of the Congo.

References

Sternotomini
Beetles described in 1907